Thomas England may refer to:

Thomas Richard England (1790–1847), Irish biographer
Thomas of England, British poet